Belén Sánchez (born December 24, 1972) is a Spanish sprint canoer who competed from the early 1990s to the early 2000s (decade). She won four medals at the ICF Canoe Sprint World Championships with a silver (K-4 200 m: 2001) and three bronzes (K-4 500 m: 1997, 1998, 2001).

Sánchez also competed in three Summer Olympics, earning her best finish of sixth in the K-4 500 m event at Atlanta in 1996.

References

Sports-reference.com profile.

1972 births
Canoeists at the 1992 Summer Olympics
Canoeists at the 1996 Summer Olympics
Canoeists at the 2000 Summer Olympics
Living people
Olympic canoeists of Spain
Spanish female canoeists
ICF Canoe Sprint World Championships medalists in kayak